Gerardo Antonio Noriega Santoveña (born 10 March 1982 in Llanes, Asturias), known simply as Gerardo, is a Spanish former professional footballer who played as a right midfielder.

External links

1982 births
Living people
People from Llanes
Spanish footballers
Footballers from Asturias
Association football midfielders
Segunda División players
Segunda División B players
Tercera División players
Sporting de Gijón B players
Sporting de Gijón players
Polideportivo Ejido footballers
Hércules CF players
Gimnàstic de Tarragona footballers
Real Avilés CF footballers
Gimnástica de Torrelavega footballers
Niki Volos F.C. players
Spanish expatriate footballers
Expatriate footballers in Greece
Spanish expatriate sportspeople in Greece